Italian draughts is a variant of the draughts family played mainly in Italy and Northern Africa.  It is a two-handed game played on a board consisting of sixty-four squares, thirty-two white and thirty-two black.  There are twenty-four pieces: twelve white and twelve black.  The board is placed so that the rightmost square on both sides of the board is black.

Gameplay 
White always moves first, and players alternate moving.  Men (called pedine—a single man is called pedina) move one square diagonally forward.  Should they reach the file farthest from the player to which they belong, they become kings (called dame, italian for "ladies"—a single one is called dama).  This is denoted by placing another piece of the same colour on top of them (or, if this is impossible, placing another piece of the other colour underneath them).  Kings can move forward or back one square, again only diagonally.

Capturing is mandatory in Italian draughts.  Should a man be found neighbouring an opposing piece behind which is an empty position, the player is compelled to attain this empty position and remove the opposing man from the board.   The huffing rule (if a piece that must capture does not do so, the opponent may, at his option, take it before his own move) was stricken from the official rules in 1934.  Men may only capture diagonally forward, and can capture a maximum of three pieces in a row.  Kings move, as well as capture, backwards; also, they are immune to men—they can only be captured by other kings.

A player wins when he has succeeded in capturing all of his opponent's pieces, or if his opponent resigns. A draw occurs when neither player can theoretically take an opposing piece.

Capturing 
A number of rules apply to captures in Italian draughts, whether by men or kings; this tends to make Italian draughts a game where many mistakes can be made.

 If a player is faced with the prospect of choosing which captures to make, the first and foremost rule to obey is to capture the greatest quantity of pieces.
 If a player may capture an equal number of pieces with either a man or king, he must do so with the king.
 If a player may capture an equal number of pieces with a king, in which one or more options contain a number of kings, he must capture the greatest number of kings possible.
 If a player may capture an equal number of pieces (each series containing a king) with a king, he must capture wherever the king occurs first.
 If none of these rules apply to the situation at hand, the player may choose according to his tactical requirements.

See also 
 International draughts
 English draughts
 Pool checkers
 Russian checkers
 Czech draughts
 Turkish draughts
 Draughts

Draughts variants
Italian inventions